Faktion is the only and self-titled debut studio album by American rock band Faktion. Roadrunner Records released the album on March 21, 2006.

Track listing
 "Forgive Me" – 3:12
 "Control" – 3:38
 "Take It All Away" – 3:12
 "Letting You Go" – 4:34
 "Six O'Clock" – 3:53
 "Distance" – 4:15
 "Maybe" – 4:56
 "Answers" – 3:33
 "Pilot" – 4:15
 "Always Wanting More" – 3:10
 "Who I Am" – 4:00
 "Better Today" – 4:12

References 

2006 debut albums
Faktion albums
Roadrunner Records albums